Stephen Graeling Ziem (born October 24, 1961) is a former professional baseball player. A right-handed pitcher, Ziem pitched in two games in Major League Baseball for the Atlanta Braves in 1987.

External links

Pura Pelota (Venezuelan Winter League)

1961 births
Living people
Atlanta Braves players
Baseball players from Milwaukee
Burlington Braves players
Cal Poly Pomona Broncos baseball players
California State Polytechnic University, Pomona alumni
Durham Bulls players
Greenville Braves players
Major League Baseball pitchers
Pulaski Braves players
Richmond Braves players
Tigres de Aragua players
American expatriate baseball players in Venezuela